Parliament of the Federation of Bosnia and Herzegovina (Serbo-Croat-Bosnian: Parlament Federacije Bosne i Hercegovine/Парламент Федерације Босне и Херцеговине) is the bicameral legislature of the Federation of Bosnia and Herzegovina (FBiH).

The lower house is the House of Representatives, while the upper house is the House of Peoples. The House of Representatives is composed of 98 members, while House of Peoples is composed of 80 members. In total, Parliament of the Federation of Bosnia and Herzegovina is composed of 178 members. Members of the House of Representatives are chosen by secret ballot, while members of the House of Peoples are chosen by each Cantonal legislature.

The Parliament of the Federation of Bosnia and Herzegovina was formed after the signing of the Washington agreement in March 1994. The Agreement was implemented during the spring of 1994, when the Constitutional Assembly of the FBiH was convoked. On June 24, it adopted and proclaimed the Constitution of the Federation of Bosnia and Herzegovina.

Powers

Powers of the Federal Parliament are described in the Constitution of the Federation of Bosnia and Herzegovina. Federal Parliament has power to elect President and Vice-President of the Federation, make a request to the Constitutional Court for dismissal of President and Vice-President, ratification of the Federal Government by majority of votes, enacting laws to exercise responsibilities allocate to the Federation Government, which shall take effect as specified therein but no sooner than when promulgated in the Official Journal, authorizing any use of military force by the Federation, which must be in accordance with international law, granting the cantons the authority to sign the agreements with the states and international organizations, with the agreement of the BiH Assembly, except of the agreements for which the BiH Assembly decides by the law that they do n to need such an agreement, approval, by the majority of votes, of the agreements with the states and international organizations, with the agreements of the BiH Assembly, except of the agreements for which the BiH Assembly decides by the law that they do not need such an agreement, financing the armed forces of the Federation and approving nominations of officers, adopting the budget of the Federation and enacting legislation to levy taxes and otherwise secure the necessary financing and performing such other responsibilities as are conferred upon it, and Chairman of the House of Representatives shall serve as Vice-President, for the necessary period.

References

Politics of the Federation of Bosnia and Herzegovina
Political organizations based in Bosnia and Herzegovina
Bosnia and Herzogovina parliaments